Warboys is a village in Huntingdonshire, England.

Warboys or Warboy may also refer to:
Warboys (surname)
 RAF Warboys, former Royal Air Force base outside the village of Warboys
 Warboy, a character in The Warchild, a 2002 novel by Karin Lowachee

War Boy or War Boys may refer to:
 War Child (disambiguation)
 SS War Boy, former name of USS Yellowstone (ID-2657), United States Navy cargo ship
 War Boy, 2000 novel by Kief Hillsbery
 The War Boy, a 1985 American film directed by Allan Eastman
 "War Boys" (Annabella Lwin song), 1986 single by Annabella Lwin
 "War Boys" (Toyah song), 1981 song by Toyah 
 The War Boys, 2009 American film
 War Boys (Mad Max), characters in the 2015 film Mad Max: Fury Road